Donald A. Foss ( – August 14, 2022) was an American billionaire businessman, the founder, chairman, and CEO of the subprime car finance company Credit Acceptance. At his death, his net worth was estimated at US$2 billion.

Early life
Foss was born  1944. His father was a used car salesman.

Career
Foss founded Credit Acceptance in 1972.  In January 2017, Foss stepped down as the company's chairman.

As of March 2018, Forbes estimated his net worth at US$1.2 billion.

Personal life
Foss was married, with three children, and lived in Farmington Hills, Michigan. He died on August 14, 2022, at the age of 78.

References

1940s births
2022 deaths
American company founders
Businesspeople from Michigan
American billionaires
American chief executives
People from Farmington Hills, Michigan